The Weifang railway station is a railway station in Weicheng District,  Weifang, Shandong. It currently lies on the Qingdao–Jinan passenger railway (running CRH and passenger trains) and Qingdao–Jinan railway (running cargo trains and some passenger trains which give ways to CRH).

There is also a branch linking to Fangzi railway station in southern Fangzi District.

The city is also served by Weifang North railway station on high-speed lines, however it is located on the northern edge of the urban area.

Service 
All types of trains stop at Weifang Station, ranging from the common trains (denoted without a letter) to the high-speed CRH trains (denoted with a "G"). The ticket price of "D"s and "G"s running on this railway is equally calculated as well. The common trains mainly offer service throughout Shandong province and major cities outside Shandong, with destinations such as Cao County, Qingdao, Yantai, Weihai and some stations have no high-speed train service.

Passengers can board the high-speed "G"-trains to Shanghai, Beijing, Changchun, Harbin, Guangzhou, Xi'an, Chengdu, Chongqing, Hangzhou, Fuzhou, etc.. On the westbound track, trains will first go to Jinan railway station before switching to the Beijing–Shanghai High-Speed Railway. There are also some lower-speed "D"-trains which run from Jinan to Qingdao, Yantai, Rongcheng(in Weihai), Longkou(in Yantai) and a few long routes to Shijiazhuang, Yuncheng and Taiyuan.

References 

Railway stations in Shandong
Railway stations in China opened in 1902
Stations on the Qingdao–Taiyuan High-Speed Railway
Stations on the Qingdao–Jinan passenger railway